The men's long jump was a track and field athletics event held as part of the athletics at the 1912 Summer Olympics programme. The competition was held on Friday, July 12, 1912. Thirty long jumpers from 13 nations competed. NOCs could enter up to 12 athletes. The event was won by Albert Gutterson of the United States, the nation's fifth gold medal in the event in five Games. Calvin Bricker of Canada became the second man to win a second medal in the long jump, adding a silver to his 1908 bronze. Sweden won its first long jump medal with Georg Åberg's bronze.

Background

This was the fifth appearance of the event, which is one of 12 athletics events to have been held at every Summer Olympics. The 1908 gold and bronze medalists, Frank Irons of the United States and Calvin Bricker of Canada, returned. Irons was a "slight favorite" after winning the 1909 and 1910 AAU championships and the central U.S. Olympic trial.

Austria, Finland, Italy, Luxembourg, and Russia each made their first appearance in the event. The United States appeared for the fifth time, the only nation to have long jumpers at each of the Games so far.

Competition format

The 1912 format continued to use the two-round format used in 1900 and 1908. Only the top three jumpers in the qualifying round advanced to the final. Each jumper had three jumps in the qualifying round; finalists received an additional three jumps, with qualifying round jumps still counting if the final jumps were not better.

Records

These were the standing world and Olympic records (in metres) prior to the 1912 Summer Olympics.

Albert Gutterson's first jump broke the Olympic record of 7.48 metres by 12 centimetres. He matched the old record with his second jump, but could not better his first mark.

Schedule

Results

The top three jumpers after three jumps received another three attempts; only Åberg was able to better his own mark.

References

Sources
 
 

Athletics at the 1912 Summer Olympics
Long jump at the Olympics